Neil Hampton is a Scottish curler.

At the national level, he is a 2000 Scottish men's champion curler.

Teams

References

External links

Living people
Scottish male curlers
Scottish curling champions
Year of birth missing (living people)
Place of birth missing (living people)